William Brown (27 February 1907 – 17 August 1976) was an English professional association footballer and sprinter. He played as a right back for Football League clubs Huddersfield Town, Watford, Exeter City and Darlington, before his playing career was interrupted by the Second World War. After its conclusion, Brown began coaching sports in the town of Apsley, becoming a football coach at nearby Hemel Hempstead Town in 1950. He continued living in Hertfordshire, and died in the City of London.

As of 2010, Brown holds the dubious distinction of having played more first team games for Watford without scoring than any other outfield player.

References 

1907 births
1976 deaths
Sportspeople from Bishop Auckland
Footballers from County Durham
English footballers
Association football fullbacks
Bishop Auckland F.C. players
Crook Town A.F.C. players
Huddersfield Town A.F.C. players
Watford F.C. players
Exeter City F.C. players
Darlington F.C. players
English Football League players